Star Maps is a 1997 American drama film co-written and directed by Miguel Arteta and starring Douglas Spain. The film is the directorial debut of Miguel Arteta, and it was first presented at the Sundance Film Festival. It was a critical hit, receiving five Independent Spirit Award nominations, including Best First Feature and Best First Screenplay.

Synopsis
This allegorical tale concerns the gap that exists between East and West Los Angeles as Latino kids try to pursue the American Dream. After five years of living in Mexico, an 18-year-old youth returns to Los Angeles with aspirations of becoming a movie star. At the urging of his father, a pimp who sells maps to stars' homes as a cover, the young man turns to hustling as a way to meet Hollywood insiders. Things start to look up when he hooks up with the producer of the popular daytime soap opera Carmel County. However his overbearing father and his mentally unstable mother threaten to get in the way of his dreams.

Cast
 Douglas Spain as Carlos Amado
 Efrain Figueroa as Pepe Amato
 Kandeyce Jorden as Jennifer Upland
 Lysa Flores as Maria Amato
 Annette Murphy as Letti
 Martha Veléz as Teressa Amato
 Robin Thomas as Martin
 Vincent Chandler as Juancito Amato
 Al Vincente as Fred Marin
 Zak Penn as Carmel County Writer
 Mike White as Carmel County Writer
 Michael Peña as Star Map Boy
 Caesar Garcia as Star Map Boy

Production
The director, Miguel Arteta, came to the US from Puerto Rico at the age of 16. He described Star Maps as the "worst idea" a first time filmmaker could attempt, due to its large number of characters and locations, as well as the unorthodox subject matter. Arteta met the movie's producer Matthew Greenfield while studying film at Wesleyan University. The duo initially tried to convince people in Hollywood to fund the film. However, in the end, it would be financed to the tune of $90,000 by a group of 15 private investors. The first investor they found committed $50,000 to the project. At this point, Arteta and Greenfield went ahead with casting and location scouting. It took a year for them to attain the remaining $40,000. Once they did, they began shooting the movie. The cast and crew primarily consisted of friends, due to the project's financial limitations.

11 months after principal photography began, Arteta wanted re-shoots to make the plot more coherent. Many of Arteta's friends initially wouldn't return his calls when he asked them to come back for the re-shoots. He stated "They thought we should have just worked with what we had and moved on, but we chose to use the money we had originally set aside for post-production to re-shoot, and then worried about raising the additional money for post."

Release
After premiering at the 1997 edition of the Sundance Film Festival, it was picked up by 20th Century Fox's indie acquisition division Fox Searchlight Pictures for $2.5 million. The deal was seen as a big coup for Arteta. Fox Searchlight would give Star Maps a US theatrical release in July 1997.

References

External links
 
 
 

1997 films
1997 comedy-drama films
American comedy-drama films
Films about prostitution in the United States
Films directed by Miguel Arteta
American LGBT-related films
Fox Searchlight Pictures films
1990s Spanish-language films
1997 directorial debut films
1990s English-language films
1997 multilingual films
American multilingual films
Spanish-language American films
Films about male prostitution in the United States
1997 independent films
American independent films
1990s American films